China Railway Xi'an Group, officially abbreviated as CR Xi'an or CR-Xi'an, formerly, Xi'an Railway Administration is a subsidiaries company under the jurisdiction of the China Railway (formerly the Ministry of Railway). It supervises the railway network within Shaanxi and northeastern parts of Sichuan. The company was founded in 2005 as a bureau and incorporated as a company in 2017.

Hub stations
 Xi'an
 Baoji
 
 Ankang

References

Rail transport in Shaanxi
China Railway Corporation